Carsten Graff is a Danish author and columnist. He has a master of computer science from Copenhagen Business School and began his professional career working for several international organizations as a communications-, computer- and media expert.

References 
Graff, Carsten (2013). Conversations with an oak tree, StemningsHotellets forlag, Copenhagen.

External links 
 Carsten Graff – official, international website:  www.carstengraff.com

1962 births
Living people